The People Next Door is an American sitcom which aired on CBS from September 18 until October 16, 1989 as part of its Fall 1989 schedule.

Synopsis
Set in Covington, Ohio, The People Next Door starred Jeffrey Jones, previously regarded as a character actor, as cartoonist Walter Kellogg, a man whose imagination was so vivid that many of the things which he imagined materialized immediately.  His wife Abigail was portrayed by Mary Gross.  They had two children, 14-year-old Matthew and 11-year-old Aurora. Abigail's sister "Cissy" (Christina Pickles) was also a regular, as was meddlesome mailman Truman Fipps (Leslie Jordan). The character of Debbie was played by Jackie Swanson.

The series proved to be a ratings disaster, and was cancelled after only five of ten of its produced episodes aired.

Cast
Jeffrey Jones as Walter Kellogg
Mary Gross as Abigail MacIntyre Kellogg
Jaclyn Bernstein as Aurora Kellogg
Chance Quinn as Matthew Kellogg
Leslie Jordan as Truman Fipps
Christina Pickles as Cissy MacIntyre

Episodes

References
 
Jackie Swanson's TV Biography

External links
1989 Fall Preview Edition Of TV Guide

1989 American television series debuts
1989 American television series endings
1980s American sitcoms
CBS original programming
English-language television shows
Television series by Warner Bros. Television Studios
Television shows set in Ohio